The Pointe Coupée Slave Conspiracy of 1795 was an attempted slave rebellion which took place in Spanish Louisiana in 1795. It has attracted a lot of attention and been the subject of much historical research. It was preceded by the Pointe Coupée Slave Conspiracy of 1791.

On May 4, 1795, 57 enslaved people and three local white men were put on trial in Point Coupée after an attempted slave insurrection at the Alma plantation of Julien de Lallande Poydras. Planters discovered a copy of Victor de Mirabeau (Mirabeau the Elder)'s Théorie de l'Impôt, which included the Declaration of the Rights of Man and of the Citizen of 1789, in one cabin. The trial ended with 23 of the enslaved people being hanged (and their decapitated heads posted along the road) and 31 more were sentenced to flogging and hard labor. All three white men were deported with two sentenced to six years forced labor in Havana.

See also
History of slavery in Louisiana
Pointe Coupée Conspiracy

References

1795 in North America
18th century in Louisiana
18th-century rebellions
Slave rebellions in North America
History of slavery in Louisiana
Conflicts in 1795
Conspiracies